Alesia is an unincorporated community in Carroll County, Maryland, United States. It is located northeast of Manchester and is southwest of Lineboro.

Alesia is located by the old Baltimore and Hanover Railroad near the intersections of: Alesia Rd & Alesia To Lineboro Rd and Alesia Rd & Hoffmanville Rd.

References

Unincorporated communities in Carroll County, Maryland
Unincorporated communities in Maryland